Mohammad Iqbal Shedai was a British Indian and later Pakistani activist who espoused independence for India and opposition to British colonial policies. He spent most of his life in self-exile in Asian and European countries.

Early life
One of eleven children, Shedai was born as Muhammad Iqbal Shedai in 1888 in Pura Hairanwala, Sialkot, British India (now Pakistan), into a Punjabi Muslim family belonging to the Rajput-Bhutta caste, to Chaudhary Ghulam Ali Bhutta, who taught science, mathematics and English at the Scotch Mission School and whose students included Muhammad Iqbal. He graduated from Sialkot's Murray College but wasn't accepted in Lahore's Law College as he was considered to be too anti-British.

Political activism
Shedai's political involvement began in 1914 when he joined Maulana Muhammad Ali Jouhar and Maulana Shaukat Ali in their organization, "Anjuman Khadami Kaaba". Soon he became a "Shedai – e –Kaaba". one of only nine in India.

In 1915, Shedai went to Hoti, Mardan, now in Pakistan, to work as a teacher in the local government school. However, he was soon expelled from N.W.F.P. for what the authorities considered to be anti-British actions. In August 1915 Shedai's movements were restricted to Pura Hairanwala in Sialkot. In October 1915, the Deputy Commissioner of Sialkot removed those restrictions. In 1916, Shedai tried to get enter the law college in Lahore, but the Principal refused him admission, supposedly due to Shedai's political activism.

Ghadr Party and Hijrat Movement
In 1918, Shedai joined the Hindustan Ghadr Party, which stood for Indian independence and soon became one of its top leaders.

In early 1920, the Hijrat Movement of protest emigration started. Maulana Muhammad Ali Jouhar and Maulana Shaikh Abdul Majeed Sindhi declared India as "Darul Harab (house of war)" and exhorted Muslims to migrate to Afghanistan.

With an introductory letter from Maulana Jouhar, Shedai started his trip to Afghanistan. He travelled to Haripur where he was joined by Akbar Qureshi. After Shedai arrived in Kabul, Amanullah Khan appointed Shedai as his Minister for Indian refugees. During his tenure there, Shedai was reportedly distressed at the poverty and deprivation faced by Indians who had migrated to Afghanistan.

Visits to Moscow and Ankara
Shedai and Akbar Qureshi then decided to visit Moscow to study the socialism of the Russian Bolshevik Party.  At that time, both men decided to work for the spread of socialism worldwide. After returning to Kabul, Qureshi went back to Haripur while Shedai went to Ankara, Turkey.

During his visit to Turkey, Shedai met with Mustafa Kemal Atatürk, the first President of Turkish Republic and İsmet İnönü, the first Prime Minister. Both Turkish leaders expressed bitterness against Muslims of the Indian Army who had fought against the Ottoman Empire during World War I.

Collaboration with Italy
In 1933, Shedai became an advisor to the Italian Foreign Ministry on propaganda efforts targeted at Muslims in India and the Middle East.  The Italians gave Shedai facilities and funding to conduct propaganda campaigns.

With the beginning of World War II, Shedai and Ajit Singh established Radio Himalaya. Using a shortwave radio station in Rome, Shedai made daily broadcasts to for Indians (many of whom thought he was broadcasting from India.

Shedai became a dangerous rival for Netaji Subhas Chandra Bose for influence with the Italians. His position is best summarized by Trott who met him in 1941. He wrote: "The driving force in the entire Indian and partly in the oriental activities of the Italian External Ministry is the Indian Iqbal Shedai, who is known in Berlin. He enjoys the fullest confidence of all Italian authorities concerned".

In 1941, Shedai established the Azad Hind Government, an exile government for an independent India, in Rome. Shedai was appointed as the President of this Government. Sardar Ajit Singh was Shedai's Minister of Information and Broadcasting.

In early 1942, Shedai served with the Fascist regime as a political commissar and consultant for the Battaglione Azad Hindoustan.  The unit was recruited from Indian POWs captured by the Royal Italian Army.  However, the unit never saw combat; it was dissolved later in 1942 after a mutiny.

In 1944, Shedai fled Rome to Milan to avoid capture by the Allied armies.

Shedai and Bose meetings in Italy
Martellos book dwells at length on the rivalry that developed in Italy and Germany between the endeavours of Chandra Bose and Mohammed Iqbal Shedai to further attention and support towards the Indian cause. In fact, partly because of Netajis choice to give priority to seeking German support (in consideration of its stronger position within the Axis) Iqbals position in Italy became gradually more important, so as to become the principal point of reference to Italy's Eastern policy. Of course, Chandra Bose kept good contacts and support of friends in the Italian Foreign Office, but Foreign Minister Ciano gradually showed mistrust towards Netaji and Italy's policy, in general, grew more and more supportive (because of its interest in courting Arab support in the Middle East) of the Muslim element in the struggle for Indian independence. Martelli records the Bose-Shedai misunderstandings and growing rivalry in detailed reports of their meetings in Italy in May–June 1941. A common, persuasive support by both on the need of a clear statement of support to India's independence by the Axis emerged from a German-Italian policy meeting in December 1941 to which Chandra Bose, Shedai and Gulam Siddiq Khan were invited to represent Indias interests. I can make the full report on this meeting, as drafted by the responsible officer in the Italian Foreign Ministry, available for the records. As it emerges from the conclusion the result of the common proddings was only a German commitment to try to have Hitler-Ribbentrop reconsider their cautious attitude of not acting prematurely. It might be interesting to note that, at this meeting, a new element had emerged, Japan's entry into war. Both Bose and Shedai expressed their apprehensions about Japans real war aims of dominating Asia and used this as a further necessity to gain Germany's and Italy's clear support for Indian national aims. External Reference 7. Bose had to cooperate (and compete) with Shedai, take his help in setting up his own radio infrastructure, even staff, and retained even the name of Shedai's organization "Azad Hindustan" with a minor abridgement as "Azad Hind".8.

Pan-Islamism
After the end of WWII and the creation of Pakistan, Shedai would turn to Pan-Islamism, having founded in 1948 the World Muslim Association of Pakistan, serving as its inaugural secretary-general as well.

Family life

Shedai decided to leave for France where he landed in Marseilles, a part of France. For a decade from 1930 to 1939, he lived in Paris.

Last years and death
After the partition of India in 1947, he moved with his French wife in Lahore for some years, before leaving for Italy and teaching Urdu at Turin University because of the apathy and enmity from the government for his progressive ideas. After refusing an Indian citizenship because "as a Pakistani he could not betray his soil", he returned to Lahore, Pakistan, in 1964, passing away on 13 January 1974. He is buried in Miani Sahib Graveyard in Mozang, Lahore.

Sources
 Shedai Papers, preserved by Dr. Muhammad Jamal Bhutta, the younger brother of Muhammad Iqbal Shedai.
 M. Phil: Thesis on Iqbal Shedai, the Revolutionary by M. Gulzar Awan of history department, University of the Punjab.
 Daily Imroaz newspaper from Lahore
 History of Sialkot by Isfaq Niaz page 560.

External sources
  A forum discussion on Radio Himala and Iqbal Shedai.
  The Battaglione Azad Hindostan and Iqbal Shedai.
   Media at the time of Mussolini and Tucci, a fascist radio in Kabul.
   Shedai, Mussolini and the mission in Afghanistan.
  Raggruppamento "Frecce Rosse"
  The free Indian legion Chapter 3
  Page 15,16 Speech of Italian AMBASSADOR ALESSANDRO QUARONI
  Subhas Chandra Bose – Another Look Part 5
  Radio Himalaya Discussion forum on Axis History

Notes

Subhas Chandra Bose
Indian independence activists from Pakistan
Pakistani revolutionaries
Punjabi people
Pan-Islamism
Academic staff of the University of Turin
1888 births
1974 deaths